Steven Keith Young (born May 17, 1969) is a Canadian politician who served as the Member of the Legislative Assembly of Alberta representing the electoral district of Edmonton-Riverview from 2012 until his defeat in 2015. He was first elected April 23, 2012, and subsequently appointed to the role of the Chief Government Whip.

Early life

Young was born in Calgary, Alberta and after moving to the Edmonton area grew up on an acreage south east of Sherwood Park in Strathcona County.

Hockey was a strong interest and saw him play Major Junior Hockey in the Western Hockey League from 1986 to 1990. The New York Islanders selected Young in the 1989 NHL Entry Draft in round 5, 90th overall.

Young attended the University of Alberta and played for the Alberta Golden Bears Hockey Team. While there, he earned a Bachelor's Degree in Education (B.Ed.), won three Canada West League Championships (1990–91, 1991–92, 1992–93), and a CIS National Title (1991–92).

Electoral history

References

1969 births
Living people
Politicians from Calgary
Politicians from Edmonton
Progressive Conservative Association of Alberta MLAs
21st-century Canadian politicians
New York Islanders draft picks
Calgary Wranglers (WHL) players
Lethbridge Hurricanes players
New Westminster Bruins players
Moose Jaw Warriors players
Prince Albert Raiders players
Portland Winterhawks players
Alberta Golden Bears ice hockey players
Canadian ice hockey players
Canadian ice hockey coaches
Ice hockey people from Alberta